This is a list of games that were cancelled from release on SNK's various systems. This includes their home consoles and their handheld consoles. Some of those games made it to the prototype stage, while others were just plans advertised and never made it through development.

MVS/AES
Notes:
†Was released on Neo Geo CD.‡Was released on standard arcade hardware.

Neo Geo CD

Neo Geo Pocket/Neo Geo Pocket Color

References

External links
Neo-Geo Protos

SNK